Michael James Stedman (born 3 February 1985) is a former political reporter at The Mercury newspaper, a News Limited publication based in Hobart, Tasmania, Australia and political adviser for Tasmanian Premier Lara Giddings.

He is currently Chief of Staff to Tasmanian Labor Leader, Rebecca White.

Living people
1985 births
Journalists from Sydney
The Mercury (Hobart) people
21st-century Australian journalists
Australian male journalists